Vladimir Stepanovich Sulima (1946 – November 25, 1968), known as The Bloody Casanova, was a Soviet serial killer and rapist.

Biography 
Sulima was born in 1946, and brought up into the family of a religious sectarian fanatic. His father forced him to read prayers, whipped him with rods and put his knees on buckwheat. Once, he even pushed his young son into a barrel and threw him into a ravine, as a result of which Sulima lost consciousness.

In 1960, at the age of 14, Sulima "shot" an adult man. After that, he repeatedly engaged in sexual relations with men and women. Later he began to attack and rape women. At the time of his arrest in 1962, when he was 16 years old, he had 13 rapes, most of which occurred in the Chernyayevsky Forest.

The court sentenced him to 8 years imprisonment with a sentence in a penal colony for minors. No one touched Sulima there, as inmates were shocked by his unnaturally large sexual organ. Sulima got a good job at the colony, and the educators, affected by the size of his penis, enjoyed sexual contact with him. He spent less than half his sentence, as the management of the colony decided that Sulima was on the path of correction. In 1966, he received parole, and got a job at the Polytechnic Institute. He married, and a child was born into the family.

Murders and arrest 
The first murder Sulima committed was in the spring of 1968. Near the "Lokomotiv" stadium, he attacked Galina Belonozhko, smashing her skull. Motivated by rape, he committed a further 9 more attacks, two of which ended in murder. Witnesses to one of the killings were children who were playing a war game, one of them noticing a distinct trait of the maniac - large, bulging ears.

Sulima's last victim survived the attack. The day after the attack, she went to the clinic, where she saw her assailant. She called the police, but he managed to escape from the facility. However, he left behind a medical card, was identified and subsequently arrested. He immediately confessed to everything, but did not have any remorse for his actions.

In the media 
 Documentary film from the series "The investigation led..." - "Bloody Casanova".

Literature

See also
 List of Russian serial killers

1946 births
1968 deaths
Executed Soviet serial killers
Male serial killers
People executed by the Soviet Union by firearm
People executed for murder
Soviet rapists